9767 Midsomer Norton is an outer main-belt asteroid discovered on March 10, 1992, by Duncan Steel at Siding Spring. It is one of very few asteroids located in the 2:1 mean motion resonance with Jupiter.

See also
 List of minor planets

References

External links 
 
 

009767
009767
Discoveries by Duncan Steel
Named minor planets
19920310